The Lordship of Heinsberg was a territory within the Holy Roman Empire, centred on the city of Heinsberg. The most notable member of the house of Heinsberg was Philip I, archbishop and archchancellor.

History
From 1413 the town of Wassenberg was given to the Lordship of Heinsberg, as security for a debt amounting to 20,000 Rhenish guilders.

Rulers
Goswin I: ?–1086 (Deposed)
Gerhard: ? – ?
: ? – 1168 (Died)
: 1168 – 1168 (Deposed)
Arnold I: 1168 – ?, younger son of Dietrich II, Count of Cleves, in 1168 became lord in right of his wife Alix of Heinsberg, possible daughter of Goswin II.
Arnold II: ? – 1218 (Died), son of Arnold and Alix.
Henry II of Sponheim (d. 1258/1259), founder of the Sponheim-Heinsberg line as Henry I, jure uxoris lord of Heinsberg in right of his wife Agnes of Heinsberg, lady of Heinsberg, daughter of Arnold II.

References

Books

Heinsberg